Cécile Lesprit-Poirier (2 November 1905 – 3 June 1990) was a French diver. She competed in two events at the 1936 Summer Olympics.

References

External links
 

1905 births
1990 deaths
French female divers
Olympic divers of France
Divers at the 1936 Summer Olympics
Place of birth missing
20th-century French women